Clinidium chevrolati is a species of ground beetle in the subfamily Rhysodinae. It was described by Edmund Reitter in 1880. It is known with some certainty only from Pico Turquino in the Sierra Maestra, Cuba—the type locality of Clinidium turquinense—the type locality of Clinidium chevrolati, "Neu Granada", seems to be in error.

Clinidium chevrolati measure  in length.

References

Clinidium
Beetles of North America
Insects of Cuba
Endemic fauna of Cuba
Beetles described in 1880
Taxa named by Edmund Reitter